The Devil Inside is a 2012 American found footage supernatural horror film directed by William Brent Bell and written by Bell and Matthew Peterman. It is a documentary-style film about a woman who becomes involved in a series of exorcisms during her quest to determine what happened to her mother, a woman who murdered three people as a result of being possessed by a demon. Produced by Peterman and Morris Paulson, the film stars Fernanda Andrade, Simon Quarterman, Evan Helmuth, and Suzan Crowley, and was released theatrically on January 6.

Despite receiving poor reviews from critics and audiences, it was a commercial success and grossed over $101 million. The film topped the US box office on its opening weekend, yet dropped drastically in the second week, before disappearing completely from the box office top ten.

Plot 

On October 30, 1989, Maria Rossi committed a triple murder during an exorcism performed on her. The Catholic Church became involved, and she has since been in a Catholic psychiatric hospital in Rome. A news story and police investigation show the three members of the clergy whom she murdered. Her daughter, Isabella, learned of the murders from her father, who died three days after telling her.

Twenty years later, Isabella is in the process of filming a documentary with filmmaker Michael Schaefer about exorcisms and, to find out more about her mother, she visits a school in Rome. She meets two priests, Ben Rawlings and David Keane, before going to see her mother Maria in the asylum. She finds that her mother speaks in different accents and has paintings all over the walls. Maria then soils herself while screaming in an unidentified language. She has inverted crosses carved into her arms and her bottom lip and tells Isabella that killing a child is against God's will. Isabella tells the priests that she had an abortion years ago and her mother had no way of knowing that—another sign that showed possible possession. David and Ben take her with them on an unsanctioned exorcism performed on Rosalita, a young woman. They bring medical equipment to determine if it is possession or mental illness. Rosalita calls Isabella by her name, despite not knowing her, and attacks the crew after spouting out obscene remarks in different languages and accents. Eventually, they get her under control.

As the crew discusses performing an exorcism and analysis on Maria, David worries about losing his job, since the Church does not authorize exorcisms without undeniable proof that the patient is indeed possessed. They persuade him to aid in the process. During the procedure, Maria mentions knowing what Ben did in the past and transfers demons to David and Isabella. The process is stopped by hospital workers and is unsuccessful.

After analyzing the data from the video and audio files, they present the evidence to the Church. David shows many signs of stress, as Ben repeatedly plays the audio files. Ben finds that there are four different demons speaking in unison. David is to perform a baptism at his church, which Michael tags along to record. When he holds the baby to start the immersion baptism, he mutters some lines from the Bible and starts forcefully submerging the baby in the holy water. The crowd rushes up to save the baby as he passes out.

Soon after, Ben finds David at home with blood all over his forearms, much the way Maria was during the exorcism. The police arrive, and David acquires an officer's handgun and holds it in his mouth. Ben tells him to fight it, but he begins to weep, reciting the Lord's Prayer, and forgets the last few words. He laughs and shoots himself. Isabella begins having a seizure.

Ben and Michael take her to the hospital. The head nurse tells them she is stable and they can leave but just then Isabella slashes a nurse's throat and tries to escape. Ben hysterically comes to the realization that Isabella is possessed. Ben and Michael take her and leave in a car, heading to get help for a potential exorcism. While Michael drives, Isabella speaks of also knowing the horrible act Ben committed, scaring Ben. She tries to strangle Michael and breathes into his mouth. He instantly shows signs of possession, unbuckling his seatbelt and accelerating into oncoming traffic. The car collides, and the corpses of Michael and Ben sit in the overturned car while Isabella is not visible.

A title card is shown informing that the case of the Rossi family is still unresolved, followed by another title card directing viewers to a website "for more information on the ongoing investigation".

Cast 

 Fernanda Andrade as Isabella Rossi
 Simon Quarterman as Father Ben Rawlings
 Evan Helmuth as Father David Keane
 Ionut Grama as Michael Schaefer
 Suzan Crowley as Maria Rossi
 Bonnie Morgan as Rosalita
 Brian Johnson as Lieutenant Dreyfus
 Preston James Hillier as Male Reporter
 D.T. Carney as Detective
 John Prosky as Father Christopher Aimes

Production 

The genesis of the film happened in 2005, as writer Matthew Peterman read about the Vatican's school of exorcism and approached director William Brent Bell on exploiting that. The duo wrote a traditional script, however they eventually, according to Peterman "got frustrated with that process" so they rewrote to a mockumentary style following a suggestion from producer Morris Paulson.

Principal photography began in 2010 in several locations, including Bucharest (Romania), Rome (Italy) and Vatican City. The film is of the "found footage" genre, and so is shot in documentary style despite being fictional. Lorenzo di Bonaventura and Steven Schneider took the movie to Paramount Pictures, who ultimately produced it through their low-budget company Insurge Pictures, who acquired the film as their first release hoping it would replicate the success of Paranormal Activity.

Reception 

The film was not screened for critics, and was subsequently almost universally called one of the worst horror films ever made. It topped the box office its opening weekend, the first after the New Year's Day holiday, displacing Mission: Impossible – Ghost Protocol, which had held that position for three straight weeks. At the time, it was the third-best January opening weekend after Cloverfield and the Star Wars special edition. In its second weekend, the film dropped 76.2%, which was the largest second weekend drop for a film since Jonas Brothers: The 3D Concert Experience (77.4%) in early 2009.

On Rotten Tomatoes, the film has an approval rating of 6% based on reviews from ninety critics, with an average rating of 3.10/10. The site's consensus is: "The Devil Inside is a cheap, choppy unscary mess, featuring one of the worst endings in recent memory." On Metacritic, the film has a score of 18% based on reviews from 19 critics, indicating "overwhelming dislike".
Peter Howell of the Toronto Star wrote that the film was a candidate for the worst film of 2012. Stephen Whitty of The Star-Ledger wrote that "after The Blair Witch Project got by with sticks and stones and offscreen noises, filmmakers started thinking they didn't have to show anything. Well, no. It's better when you don't show too much – but if your story is about the supernatural, eventually you're going to have to come up with something. The Devil Inside can’t." Michael Phillips of the Chicago Tribune felt that the film "joins a long, woozy-camera parade of found-footage scare pictures, among them The Blair Witch Project, the Paranormal Activity films and certain wedding videos that won't go away." Michael Rechtshaffen of The Hollywood Reporter stated that the film "proves as scary and unsettling as a slab of devil's food cake – only considerably less satisfying. The New York Times reviewer Manohla Dargis had a positive response to Suzan Crowley's acting and the scenes where the possessed is played by a contortionist, but considered that The Devil Inside was another foray into "a tediously exhausted subgenre that was already creatively tapped out when The Blair Witch Project spooked audiences more than a decade ago."

The film's ending, in particular, came under heavy criticism. "Is it the worst movie ending of all time?" David Haglund asked in Slate, citing various negative audience reaction to that aspect of the film online. "What upset them even more than its abruptness", he suggested, "was the title immediately following it that urged audiences to visit a website to learn more. "[It's] a marketing twist that makes audiences feel taken advantage of," said Haglund. The writers defended themselves by saying that they knew the unconventional closure would draw criticism, but "felt authentic to us" as according to co-writer Matthew Peterman, "Sometimes real life doesn't follow a perfect structure. Things aren't always wrapped up and resolved when or how you'd like them to be. All of us enjoyed leaving things open ended. We thought it was visceral, we thought it was unique." Audiences then flooded the Internet with videos of furious reactions, and demanding refunds from Paramount Pictures. Some pointed out the website link being the worst addition, as they felt they paid admission to an incomplete film, and were rewarded with an ending website title card that did not work from opening night to now. Director William Brent Bell added that the title card directing to a website was added by Paramount, given they "thought it was kind of cool to continue the story on this website".

Besides the preponderance of negative reviews, there were a few critics who gave the film a positive review. Steve Barton of Dread Central stated, "The Devil Inside is home to moments that will shock, scare, disturb, and leave you gasping. It's a trip to the dark side that's well worth taking." Joe Leydon of Variety wrote that the film "generates a fair amount of suspense during sizable swaths of its familiar but serviceable exorcism-centric scenario."

Legacy 

The film's commercial success despite negative critical and audience reaction made it one of several that led studios to reconsider their longtime practice of confining horror films to the dump months and Halloween season. "For years, horror movies made $19–20 million in a January release. They would take the weekend and that would be it," C. Robert Cargill of Ain't It Cool News told Hollywood.com. "But The Devil Inside proved that even in our worst dumping ground, you can appeal to a market that won't see movies, and in fact they'll throw money at a terrible movie if it looks like it's good. I mean, $35 million is sick money for an opening weekend for a film that cost, what, $250,000?"

See also 

 Exorcism in Christianity

Notes

References

External links 
 
  
 
 Archived copy of the Rossi Files website linked in the film

2012 films
2012 horror films
2010s English-language films
2010s supernatural horror films
American supernatural horror films
Demons in film
Films about exorcism
Films directed by William Brent Bell
Films scored by Brett Detar
Films set in 1989
Films set in 2009
Films set in Rome
Films shot in Bucharest
Films shot in Rome
Found footage films
Paramount Pictures films
2010s American films